Oppenheimer is a 2015 play on the life of physicist J. Robert Oppenheimer by the British writer Tom Morton-Smith. It premiered with the Royal Shakespeare Company in Stratford-upon-Avon from 15 January to 7 March 2015, transferring to the Vaudeville Theatre in London from 27 March to 23 May. Oppenheimer was played by John Heffernan; other cast members included Jamie Wilkes, Catherine Steadman, Ben Allen as Edward Teller, William Gaminara as General Leslie Groves, Ross Armstrong as Haakon Chevalier and Jack Holden as Robert Wilson.

References

2015 plays
Plays about World War II
Plays based on real people
Biographical plays about scientists
Cultural depictions of J. Robert Oppenheimer
Plays about the atomic bombings of Hiroshima and Nagasaki
Manhattan Project in popular culture